Suzhou Guangfu Airport , also known as Suzhou West Airfield, is a military air base of the People's Liberation Army Air Force in Suzhou, Jiangsu province, China, located 22 kilometers southwest of Suzhou City. From February 1994 until 29 October 2002 it briefly served civil flights for Suzhou, but is now exclusively used by the military. Suzhou is now mainly served by Sunan Shuofang International Airport, Shanghai Hongqiao International Airport, and Shanghai Pudong International Airport.

See also

List of airports in China
List of People's Liberation Army Air Force airbases

References

Airports in Jiangsu
Chinese Air Force bases
Transport in Suzhou
Defunct airports in China